8th TFCA Awards 
December 16, 2004

Best Film: 
 Sideways 
The 8th Toronto Film Critics Association Awards, honoring the best in film for 2004, were held on 16 December 2004.

Winners
Best Actor: 
Paul Giamatti – Sideways
Best Actress: 
Imelda Staunton – Vera Drake
Best Animated Film: 
The Triplets of Belleville
Best Canadian Film: 
The Triplets of Belleville
Best Director: 
Michel Gondry – Eternal Sunshine of the Spotless Mind
Best Documentary Film: 
The Fog of War
Best Film: 
Sideways
Best First Feature: 
Maria Full of Grace
Best Foreign Language Film: 
Hero • Hong Kong/China
Best Screenplay: 
Eternal Sunshine of the Spotless Mind – Charlie Kaufman
Best Supporting Actor: 
Clive Owen – Closer
Best Supporting Actress: 
Virginia Madsen – Sideways

References

2004
2004 film awards
2004 in Toronto
2004 in Canadian cinema